Patrik Hamrla (born May 21, 2003) is a Czech ice hockey goaltender who plays for Rimouski Océanic in the QMJHL. He was drafted by the Carolina Hurricanes in the third round of the 2021 NHL Entry Draft with the 83rd overall pick in the draft.

References

External links
 

2003 births
Living people
Czech ice hockey goaltenders
Carolina Hurricanes draft picks
HC Karlovy Vary players
Rimouski Océanic players
Sportspeople from Zlín
Czech expatriate ice hockey players in Canada